David Bean may refer to:

 David Bean (judge) (born 1954), British judge of the Court of Appeal of England and Wales
 David Marks Bean (1832–1884), Florida state legislator
 David R. Bean (1827–?), Wisconsin state legislator